Sant'Agata li Battiati (Sicilian: Sant'Àita li Vattiati) is a comune (municipality) in the Metropolitan City of Catania in the Italian region Sicily, located very near to Catania.

Sant'Agata li Battiati borders the following municipalities: Catania, Gravina di Catania, San Giovanni la Punta, Tremestieri Etneo.

References

External links
 Official website

Cities and towns in Sicily